Joe Cummings may refer to:
 Joe Cummings (poet), Canadian poet
 Joe Cummings (American football), American football linebacker

See also
 Joseph Cummings, American university president
 Jo Cummings (Joseph Theodore Cummings), English footballer